Stomatium ermininum, called the ermine chop, is a species of flowering plant in the ice plant genus Stomatium, native to South Africa. Its yellow flowers open in the evening and are banana-scented. It has gained the Royal Horticultural Society's Award of Garden Merit.

References

ermininum
Endemic flora of South Africa
Plants described in 1926